Pınarbaşı District is a district of the Kastamonu Province of Turkey. Its seat is the town of Pınarbaşı. Its area is 546 km2, and its population is 5,688 (2021).

Composition
There is one municipality in Pınarbaşı District:
 Pınarbaşı

There are 27 villages in Pınarbaşı District:

 Aşağıaktaş
 Başköy
 Boğazkaya
 Çavuşköy
 Çengel
 Demirtaş
 Dizdarlı
 Esentepe
 Gümberi
 Hocalar
 Ilıca
 Kalaycı
 Kapancı
 Karacaören
 Karafasıl
 Kayabükü
 Kerte
 Kurtlugelik
 Mirahor
 Muratbaşı
 Savaş
 Sümenler
 Urva
 Uzla
 Üyükören
 Yamanlar
 Yukarıaktaş

References

Districts of Kastamonu Province